Robert Christopher Towneley Parker, FBA (born 19 October 1950) is a British ancient historian, specialising in ancient Greek religion and Greek epigraphy.

Robert Parker was educated at St Paul's School, London  and at New College, Oxford under Geoffrey de Ste Croix. From 1996 until his retirement in 2016 he was the Wykeham Professor of Ancient History at New College, Oxford University. Before that, from 1976–96, he was Tutor in Greek and Latin Languages and Literature at Oriel College, Oxford.  He was elected a Fellow of the British Academy in 1998. He is also a Foreign Member of the Royal Danish Academy of Sciences and Letters, an Officier of the Ordre des Palmes Académiques in France, and a Member of the Academia Europaea. In 2013 he was the 99th Sather Professor at the University of California, Berkeley.

Select Works

Books
 Miasma: Pollution and Purification in Early Greek religion. Oxford, 1983. 
 Athenian Religion: A History. Oxford (Clarendon Press), 1996. 
 Polytheism and Society at Athens. Oxford, 2005. 
 On Greek Religion. Ithaca, NY, 2011. .

Edited works
 (ed. with Peter Derow) Herodotus and His World: Essays from a Conference in Memory of George Forrest. Oxford: 2003. 
 (ed. with J. Ma and N. Papazarkadas) Interpreting the Athenian empire. London, 2009. 
 (ed. with Christiane Sourvinou-Inwood) Athenian myths and festivals: aglauros, erechtheus, plynteria, panathenaia, dionysia. New York, NY, 2011. 
 (ed.) Personal Names in Ancient Anatolia Oxford University Press 2013.

Articles and chapters
 'The Origins of Pronoia: A Mystery' in Apodosis: essays presented to Dr W.W. Cruickshank to mark his 80th birthday, 1992.
 ‘Early Orphism’ in A. Powell ed., The Greek World. London, 1995: 483-510.
 ‘Pleasing Thighs: Reciprocity in Greek Religion’ in Gill, C., N. Postlethwaite, & R. Seaford eds., Reciprocity in Ancient Greece. Oxford, 1998: 105-25.
 ‘Greek states and Greek oracles’ in Cartledge, P.A. & F.D. Harvey eds., Crux : essays presented to G. E. M. de Ste. Croix on his 75th birthday. History of Political Thought 6. Exeter, 1985. Republished in R.G.A. Buxton ed., Oxford Readings in Greek Religion. Oxford, 2000: 76-108.
 'The Problem of the Greek Cult Epithet' in Opuscula Atheniensia 28 (2003).
 'New 'Panhellenic' Festivals in Hellenistic Greece', in Schlesier, R. & U. Zellman (eds), Mobility and Travel in the Mediterranean from Antiquity to the Middle Ages, Münster 2004.
 'What are Sacred Laws?' in Harris, E.M. & L. Rubinstein (eds) The Law and the Courts in Ancient Greece, Duckworth 2004.
 'A New Funerary Gold Leaf from Pherae', Archeologiki Efimeris, 2004.
 'Sale of a Priesthood on Chios' in Chiakon Simposion is mnimin  W.G. Forrest, Eliniki Epigrafiki Eteria, Athens, 2006.
 'Patroioi theoi: The Cults of Sub-groups and Identity in the Greek World' in Rasmussen, A.H. & S.W. (eds), Religion and Society: Rituals, Resources and Identity in the Ancient Graeco-Roman World, Rome 2008.
 'Tis ho thuon?' in Lydie Bodiou, Véronique Mehl, Jacques Oulhen, Francis Prost et Jérôme Wilgaux (eds.) Chemin faisant. Mythes, cultes et société en Grèce ancienne. Mélanges en l’honneur de Pierre Brulé, 2009.
 'Subjection, Synoecism, and Religious Life', in Funke, P & N. Luraghi (eds), The Politics of Ethnicity and the Crisis of the Peloponnesian League, Harvard University Press 2009.
 ‘A Funerary Foundation from Hellenistic Lycia’, Chiron, 40 (2010): 103-120.
 'Epigraphy and Greek Religion' in Epigraphy and the Historical Sciences. British Academy, 2012.
 'Commentary on Journal of Cognitive Historiography, Issue 1', JCH 1.2 (2014) 186-192.
 'The Lot Oracle at Dodona' Zeitschrift für Papyrologie und Epigraphik, 194 (2015), 111-114.

References

External links
 Full bibliography of Robert Parker's articles and books 

1950 births
Living people
People educated at St Paul's School, London
Alumni of New College, Oxford
Fellows of New College, Oxford
Wykeham Professors of Ancient History
British classical scholars
Scholars of ancient Greek history
Fellows of the British Academy